Đà Nẵng Women's Hospital is the third largest hospital in the Vietnamese city of Đà Nẵng, behind Đà Nẵng Hospital, and Đà Nẵng C Hospital.

References

Buildings and structures in Da Nang
Hospitals in Vietnam
Women's hospitals
Women in Vietnam